Longxugou (Chinese: 《龙须沟》 "Dragon Beard Ditch" "Dragon Whisker Creek") is a 1951 Chinese play by Lao She written at the invitation of the Beijing Government for Li Bozhao's Beijing People's Art Theatre. The play is named after the Beijing neighbourhood, at the time being presented as a model of socialist reconstruction.

References

1951 plays
Plays by Lao She
Beijing in fiction
Plays set in the 1950s
Plays set in the 1940s